Dankuni  is a  railway junction station on the Howrah–Bardhaman chord and is located in Hooghly district in the Indian state of West Bengal.

History
The Howrah–Bardhaman chord, a shorter link to Bardhaman from Howrah than the Howrah–Bardhaman main line, was constructed in 1917. In 1932, the Calcutta chord line was built over the Willingdon Bridge joining Dum Dum and Dankuni.

Major Trains
Agartala - Sir M. Visvesvaraya Terminal Humsafar Express
Silchar - Thiruvananthapuram Aronai Superfast Express
Silchar - Coimbatore Superfast Express
Dibrugarh–Kanyakumari Vivek Express
Guwahati- Sir M. Visvesvaraya Terminal Kaziranga Superfast Express
Guwahati–Secunderabad Express
New Tinsukia–Sir M. Visvesvaraya Terminal Weekly Express
Kamakhya - Lokmanya Tilak Terminus Karmabhoomi Express.
Sir M. Visvesvaraya Terminal - Bhagalpur Anga Express
Sir M. Visvesvaraya Terminal - Muzaffarpur Express

Electrification
Howrah–Bardhaman chord was electrified in 1964–66.

Diesel Loco Component Factory
Trial production has started in the Diesel Component Factory at Dankuni. Built at a cost of Rs. 84.21 crores, it was inaugurated by Mamata Banerjee, Chief Minister of West Bengal on 28 May 2012. The components manufactured are being supplied to Banaras Locomotive Works.

Electric Loco Component Factory

Construction of the Rs. 270.77 crore Electric Loco Component Factory is in progress.

Dankuni Freight Yard
A project is on to remodel the Dankuni Goods Yard and develop it as Dankuni Freight Yard. It will be a multi-purpose freight terminal that would consolidate the entire freight movement in one place. It will ease the load of Howrah, Sealdah, Shalimar and Chitpur yards.

Dedicated Freight Corridor
The 1839 km long eastern dedicated freight corridor has been proposed from Dankuni to Ludhiana, in Punjab.

References

External links

  Trains to Howrah
 Trains to Sealdah

Railway stations in Hooghly district
Howrah railway division
Kolkata Suburban Railway stations